The context-based model of the counterintuitiveness effect  is a cognitive model of The Minimal Counterintuitiveness Effect (or MCI-effect for short) i.e., the finding by many cognitive scientists of religion that minimally counterintuitive concepts are more memorable for people than intuitive and maximally counterintuitive concepts  

The context-based model emphasizes the role played by the context in which a concept appears in making it counterintuitive. This is in contrast to the traditional (also called content-based) accounts of the MCI-effect which underscore the role played by context.  Barrett & Nyhoff (2001) claim that this is necessary in order to explain cross-cultural success of religious concepts.
Although research on schemas and scripts suggests the possibility that incongruent concepts may be better remembered thus contributing to their transmission, these conceptual structures are culturally variable to a large extent and will not provide an explanation for cross-culturally prevalent classes of concepts.
The context-based model was first proposed by cognitive scientist Afzal Upal in 2005  and has been subsequently elaborated in a number of publications.  According to the context-based model, counterintuitiveness of a concept depends on the mental knowledge activated in the mind of a reader at the time at which the reader processes the concept in question.  Since this mental knowledge clearly varies from person to person, a concept that is counterintuitive to one person may not be so for another person.  Furthermore, a concept may be counterintuitive to a person at one time but not at another time. 

In fact the context-based model predicts that since people learn, their conceptual representations change over time.  When people encounter a minimally counterintuitive concept for the first time, they are forced to make sense out of it (Upal (2005) labelled it as the postdiction process).  The postdiction process results in the formation of new knowledge structures and in strengthening of existing knowledge structures.  Because of these new knowledge structures, when the same concept is encountered again, it does not seem as counterintuitive as it did in the past.  The context-based model predicts that over time the counterintuitive concepts come to lose their very counterintuitiveness (and the memory advantages it confers upon the concept).

References

Memory
Cognitive science